Ferran or Ferrán is a surname. Notable people with the surname include:

Anne Ferran (born 1949), Australian photographer
Augusto Ferrán (1835–1880), Spanish poet
Eilís Ferran (born 1962), Northern Irish legal scholar, solicitor and academic administrator
Francis Ferran (d. 1923), Irish politician
Gerardo Díaz Ferrán (born 1942), Spanish businessman
Gil de Ferran (born 1967), French-born Brazilian professional racing driver and team owner
Javier Ferrán (born 1956), Spanish businessman
Kim Ferran (born 1958), British speed skater
Pascale Ferran (born 1960), French film director and screenwriter
Patsy Ferran (born 1989), Spanish-British actress
Vilma Ferrán (1940–2014), Argentine actress

See also
Ferren, given name and surname
Ferrin, given name and surname